Physocrotaphus ceylonicus is a species of beetle in the family Carabidae, the only species in the genus Physocrotaphus.

References

Anthiinae (beetle)